Colonel Gordon Guthrie Malcolm Bachelor was Lord Lieutenant of Kirkcudbright from 7 September 1975 to 16 November 1976.

Notes

Lord-Lieutenants of Kirkcudbright
King's Own Scottish Borderers officers